Therobia is a genus of flies in the family Tachinidae. Therobia Leonidei is a species of Therobia. Therobia Leonidei is a parasitoid, th is means that they are parasitic, laying their eggs within a body of a host. In the case of Therobia Leonidei, its most common host is a type of bush-cricket called the Tettigonia Viridissima Linnaeus. Males of this species are most often the target of Therobia Leonidei. Tettigonia Viridissima Linnaeus produce certain sounds to a ttract females for mating, the Therobia Leonidei has the ability to track down these bush-crickets by listening for this mating call.

References

Tachinidae
Diptera of Asia